Hermann Josef Nellessen (29 April 1923 – 2004) was a German composer and conductor.

Life 
Born in Aachen, Nellessen studied piano and conducting with Hermann Abendroth at the Hochschule für Musik und Tanz Köln. In 1954, he moved to the GDR, where he worked as musical director at the theatres in Brandenburg and Cottbus and as director of the Neubrandenburg State Symphony Orchestra.

Nellessen was a member of the Liberal Democratic Party of Germany. In March 1977, he was elected as a member of the Central Executive Committee of the LDPD at the 12th Party Congress of the LDPD in Weimar.

From 1979, Nellessen worked as a lecturer at the Hochschule für Musik "Hanns Eisler" in Berlin. His compositional work concentrated on symphonic and concertante works. Since the 1980s, he has increasingly turned to choral music.

Work 
His oeuvre includes numerous choral works, folk song arrangements and settings of texts and poems.

Collaboration 
 Der Mond ist aufgegangen
 Still, weil's Kindlein schlafen will
 O Tannenbaum, du trägst ein grünes Kleid
 Süßer die Glocken nie klingen after "Süßer die Glocken nie klingen"
 Sah ein Knab ein Röslein steh'n
 Wenn ich ein Vöglein wär

Choral pieces
 Ein gutes Tier ist das Klavier (text by Wilhelm Busch)
 Es wollt ein Jägerlein Jagen
 Die Nachtigall
 Ich wollte in der Stille sein

Honours 
Nellessen was awarded the Carl Blechen and the Fritz Reuter prizes.

References

External links 
 

20th-century German composers
20th-century classical musicians
1923 births
2004 deaths
People from Aachen